7 Series Sampler: Ashanti is an EP by American R&B singer Ashanti, released in the United States on May 20, 2003. The EP contained no new, original material and were just cuts from her multi-platinum debut album, Ashanti. The EP peaked at number 142 on the Billboard 200 on June 21, 2003.

Track listing

Charts

Weekly charts

Release history

References

2003 compilation albums
Albums produced by Chink Santana
Albums produced by Irv Gotti
Ashanti (singer) albums